League Park was a stadium in San Antonio, Texas.  It was primarily used for baseball and was the home of minor league San Antonio Bears and Indians.

History
The ballpark was used from 1925 through 1932. It was located at East Josephine and Isleta streets near Brackenridge Park Golf Course, and had a capacity of 6,000 people. It hosted its first night game on July 24, 1930, with 3,400 in attendance. It burned down on June 18, 1932, after a fire started in the clubhouse.

League Park was used for spring training by the Boston Red Sox in 1924, and hosted Babe Ruth and the New York Yankees in a preseason game on March 31, 1930.

A different ballpark in San Antonio, Block Stadium, was used from 1913 through 1924; it was also known as "League Park" beginning in 1915.

Sources
 "Baseball in the Lone Star State: Texas League's Greatest Hits," Tom Kayser and David King, Trinity University Press 2005

References

External links
Ballpark history

Minor league baseball venues
Baseball venues in San Antonio
Baseball venues in Texas
Defunct baseball venues in the United States
Defunct minor league baseball venues
Demolished sports venues in Texas
1923 establishments in Texas
1932 disestablishments in Texas
Sports venues completed in 1923
Sports venues demolished in 1932
Boston Red Sox spring training venues